The 1960–61 Danish 1. division season was the fourth season of ice hockey in Denmark, and the first season of the Danish 1. division. Four teams participated in the league, and KSF Copenhagen won the championship.

Regular season

Relegation
 Furesø - Horsens SF 22:0 
 Furesø - Silkeborg SF 6:1

Silkeborg SF was relegated to the 2. division, and Furesø was promoted to the 1. division for the 1961–62 season.

External links
Season on eliteprospects.com

Danish
1960 in Danish sport
1961 in Danish sport